"God Bless Our Homeland Ghana" is the national anthem of Ghana; it was adopted in 1957.

History

The music for the national anthem was originally composed by Philip Gbeho and sung to lyrics written by Emmanuel Pappoe-Thompson. However the words were revised by a literary committee in the Office of the then head of state, Kwame Nkrumah. Michael Kwame Gbordzoe has made claims to the current lyrics being used saying that it was written by him after the overthrow of President Nkrumah. A competition was held and Kwame Gbordzoe, who was then a student at Bishop Herman College, presented the current lyrics which were chosen to replace "Lift High The Flag Of Ghana" which had been officially adopted after independence and used as Ghana's national anthem during Nkrumah's presidency.

Lyrics

Current lyrics 
The current lyrics of the "God Bless Our Homeland Ghana" national anthem that has been in use since the 1970s were written by Michael Kwame Gbordzoe while a student within the framework of a national competition, and is accompanied by Ghana's national pledge.

Thus, the officially current lyrics of "God Bless Our Homeland Ghana" are as follows:

Thus, although Philip Gbeho’s composition is still being used, the current lyrics beginning "God Bless our Homeland Ghana" do not originate from him.

Michael Kwame Gbordzoe, who became a scientist by profession, has drawn the attention of the Ghana Government to the fact that although his lyrics have been adopted for the country’s national anthem since the 1970s, there has so far been no official Ghana Government recognition for his work, which may be attributed to the abrupt changes in regimes in Ghana in the past.

Messages were sent to various Ghanaian government agencies, and was also discussed on air at the Ghana Broadcasting Corporation (GBC), Uniiq FM programme PTGlive, on 9 March 2008.

National Pledge of Ghana

The National Pledge of Ghana is recited immediately after "God Bless Our Homeland Ghana".

References

External links

 Ghana: "God Bless Our Homeland Ghana" - audio of the national anthem of Ghana, with information and lyrics (archive link)
Ghana national anthem, instrumental version
Ghana national anthem, vocal version
"Hail the name of Ghana" - MIDI Instrumental

African anthems
Ghanaian music
National symbols of Ghana
Articles containing video clips
National anthem compositions in A-flat major